The Fool Circle is the twelfth studio album by the Scottish hard rock band Nazareth, released in February 1981. "Cocaine" was a live cover of the song written by J. J. Cale and recorded in 1977 by Eric Clapton. There are remastered editions of the album with different sets of bonus tracks.

Because in 1997 Castle Communications was unwilling to produce a 2-CD set of the double live album 'Snaz, four tracks were removed so that a remastered version could be released on a single CD. Rob Corich, who was doing the remastering, included these songs here as bonus tracks to rectify this.

The Fool Circle is notable for a reggae sound on many of the songs. In an interview bassist Pete Agnew commented:
"'Fool Circle' was the nearest we came to making a concept album, trying to inject a bit of humour into a pretty heavy subject. I think the fact that we recorded it on the island of Montserrat might account for a teeny bit of reggae poking its way through."

Track listing

Cocaine was recorded at Wendler Arena, Saginaw, Michigan on 25 May 1980.

1998 Castle Communications Remaster Bonus Tracks

Those are the tracks that didn't fit on 1997 single CD remaster of 'Snaz album.

2002 30th Anniversary Bonus Tracks

2010 Salvo Remaster Bonus Tracks

Morgentau and Crazy (A Suitable Case for Treatment) are also available on Salvo reissue of 'Snaz album.
The last four tracks are from unedited version of the EP Nazareth Live released in 1980.

Personnel

Band members
Dan McCafferty - vocals
Manny Charlton - guitars
Pete Agnew - bass guitar, vocals
Darrell Sweet - drums

Additional musicians
Zal Cleminson – 12-string acoustic guitar on "Cocaine"
John Locke – keyboards
Jeff Baxter – synthesizer, vocoder

Other credits
Recorded and mixed at Air Studios 
Geoff Emerick – sound engineer
Alan Schmidt and Pat Carroll – sleeve design
Illustration by Chris Moore

Chart performance

Certifications

References

Nazareth (band) albums
1981 albums
A&M Records albums
Vertigo Records albums
Albums recorded at AIR Studios